A general election was held in the U.S. state of South Carolina on November 4, 2014. All of South Carolina's executive officers were up for election as well as both United States Senate seats, and all of South Carolina's seven seats in the United States House of Representatives.

Primary elections were held on June 10, 2014, and primary runoffs were held on June 24.

Governor

Incumbent Republican Governor Nikki Haley ran for re-election to a second term.

Democratic State Senator Vincent Sheheen, the nominee in 2010 ran again.

Republican-turned-Independent Tom Ervin, an attorney, former state representative and former circuit court judge ran, but withdrew in the final week and endorsed Sheheen.  Other candidates included Libertarian businessman Steve French; and former NFL player Morgan Bruce Reeves of the United Citizens Party.

Haley won re-election.

Lieutenant Governor
This was the last election in which the lieutenant governor was elected separately from the governor.  Republican Ken Ard, who was elected in 2010, resigned the office in March 2012 while under investigation for ethics charges. He was succeeded by a fellow Republican, President pro tempore of the South Carolina Senate Glenn F. McConnell. McConnell had planned to run, but withdrew from the race in January 2014 and was announced as the next President of the College of Charleston in March, a position he took up in June.

The state constitution requires that the Senate President pro tempore become lieutenant governor in the event of a vacancy but McConnell's successor as president pro tempore, Republican state senator John E. Courson, expressed no desire to give up his Senate seat to serve as lieutenant governor for six months. He went as far as resigning as president pro tempore, to avoid becoming lieutenant governor, a position widely regarded as one of the weakest in the state. There was much confusion as to what would happen next, with McConnell saying he would delay his resignation so as not to leave the state "in a constitutional crisis" and Courson and Senate Judiciary Committee Chairman Larry A. Martin saying that they knew of no Senator who would want to become lieutenant governor for six months. The dispute was finally ended when Democrat Yancey McGill agreed to become Senate President pro tempore, and then lieutenant governor. After he ascended to that office, Republican Hugh K. Leatherman Sr. became the new Senate President pro tempore.

Businessman Mike Campbell, who lost the runoff for lieutenant governor in 2010, businessman Pat McKinney, former attorney general of South Carolina and candidate for governor in 2010 Henry McMaster and minister Ray Moore ran for the Republican nomination.

As no candidate won a majority of the vote, a runoff was held. A recount had been scheduled to take place as the difference between second-placed Pat McKinney and third-placed Mike Campbell was only 0.41%, but McKinney withdrew from the race, citing personal reasons. Campbell thus faced first-placed Henry McMaster in the runoff.

State Representative Bakari Sellers ran for the Democrats.  McMaster won the general election.

Attorney General
Incumbent Republican Attorney General Alan Wilson ran for re-election to a second term in office.

Attorney, President of the National Federation of the Blind of South Carolina and candidate for South Carolina's 7th congressional district in 2012 Parnell Diggs ran as the Democratic nominee.  Wilson defeated him and won re-election.

Secretary of State

Incumbent Republican Secretary of State Mark Hammond is running for re-election to a fourth term in office.

Nonprofit consultant Ginny Deerin ran as the Democratic nominee. She was endorsed by the Club for Growth, a conservative political organization that usually supports Republicans. She was the first ever Democrat running for statewide office to have been endorsed by them.  However, Hammond still won re-election.

Treasurer
Incumbent Republican Treasurer Curtis M. Loftis Jr. is running for re-election to a second term in office.

Brian Adams ran against Loftis Jr. in the Republican primary.

No Democrat filed to run for the office.  Loftis won re-election.

Comptroller General
Incumbent Republican Richard Eckstrom is running for re-election to a fourth term in office.

He was being challenged in the Republican primary by Robert D. Shelley, but Shelley withdrew.

Kyle Herbert is running for the Democrats.  Eckstrom won re-election.

Superintendent of Education
Incumbent Republican Superintendent of Education Mick Zais did not run for re-election to a second term in office.

Lee Atwater's widow Sally Atwater, Anderson County School Board member Gary Burgess, South Carolina Department of Education official Meka Bosket Childs, Amy Cofield, candidate for the State House in 2010 Sheri Few, Don Jordan, Charleston County School Board member and candidate for South Carolina's 1st congressional district in 2013 Elizabeth Moffly and former State Representative Molly Mitchell Spearman ran for the Republican nomination.

As no candidate won a majority, a runoff was held between the top two finishers, Molly Mitchell Spearman and Sally Atwater. Atwater was considered to be the frontrunner, until she called conservative talk show host Russ Cassell on News Radio WORD to talk about her candidacy. In the "awkward", "evasive" and "awful, incomprehensible, it-should-force-her-to-drop-out-of-the-race" interview, she seemed unable to give answers to basic questions about sex education and the teaching of evolution, to Cassell's amazement. After Atwater hung up, Cassell concluded: "Folks, I don't want to be brutal, I don't want to be mean. What you have just heard is an example of a person running for public office on name recognition only, who is clueless." Atwater subsequently apologized for her performance and the interview, which was uploaded to YouTube, went viral. Atwater subsequently declined to debate Spearman before the runoff, with a spokesman for Spearman saying that "given [Atwater's] debate performance in the primary and her recent radio interview on WORD-FM, we can understand why she has made this political calculation. Atwater was also the subject of a lawsuit alleging that as a teacher she "routinely harassed, physically assaulted, and psychologically tormented" a disabled student. Atwater's campaign dismissed the lawsuit as "baseless and frivolous".

Endorsements

South Carolina Department of Education official Montrio M. Belton Sr., Sheila C. Gallagher, State Representative Jerry Govan and Tom Thompson ran for the Democratic nomination.

As no candidate won a majority, a runoff was held between the top two finishers, Sheila C. Gallagher and Tom Thompson.

Ed Murray ran as the American Party nominee.  Spearman won the general election.

Commissioner of Agriculture
Incumbent Republican Commissioner of Agriculture Hugh Weathers, who was appointed to the position in September 2004, ran for re-election to a third full term in office.

Joe Farmer ran against Weathers in the Republican primary.

Emile DeFelice of the American Party and David Edmond of the United Citizens Party also ran. No Democrat filed to run for the office.  Weathers won re-election.

Adjutant General
Incumbent Republican Adjutant General Robert E. Livingston Jr. ran for re-election to a second term in office.

James Breazeale ran against Livingston Jr. in the Republican primary.

No Democrat filed to run for the office.  Livigston won re-election.  Because South Carolina voters approved Amendment 2 in the 2014 general election, this will be the last time that the adjutant general is popularly elected.  Because South Carolina is the only state in the union to elect its adjutant general, this is the final time that a state adjutant general will stand for election in the United States, barring future state constitutional changes.

United States Senate
Regularly-scheduled election

Incumbent Republican Senator Lindsey Graham is running for re-election to a third term in office. He faced six challengers in the Republican primary: pastor and businessman Det Bowers, State Senator Lee Bright, businessman and candidate for South Carolina's 3rd congressional district in 2010 Richard Cash, attorney, Lieutenant Colonel in the United States Army Reserve and candidate for lieutenant governor in 2010 Bill Connor, attorney Benjamin Dunn and businesswoman and author Nancy Mace. Graham won the primary with 56% of the vote, negating the need for a runoff.

State Senator Brad Hutto defeated entrepreneur Jay Stamper in the Democratic primary.

Former Republican State Treasurer Thomas Ravenel is running as an Independent. Libertarian Victor Kocher is also running.

Special election

Incumbent Republican Senator Tim Scott, who was appointed to the office in January 2013 after Jim DeMint resigned, is running for election to the remaining part of the term. The seat will be up for election to a six-year term in 2016.

Scott defeated Randall Young in the Republican primary.

Richland County Councilwoman Joyce Dickerson defeated former York County Councilman Sidney Moore and attorney and candidate for South Carolina's 7th congressional district in 2012 Harry Pavilack for the Democratic nomination.

Independents Brandon Armstrong, a painting contractor, and Jill Bossi, former Vice President of the American Red Cross, are also running.

United States House of Representatives

All of South Carolina's seven seats in the United States House of Representatives will be up for election in 2014.

Advisory Questions and Referendums

Several advisory questions were placed on the primary election ballots to advise the major state parties on the positions of their membership on major policy questions.  In the general election, voters also voted on two constitutional amendments.  All passed with heavy majorities.

Primary Advisory Questions

Democratic Advisory Question One asked primary voters whether each state, rather than Congress, should determine whether to allow and how to regulate online gaming.

Democratic Advisory Question Two asked whether gaming laws should be "modified" to fund transportation needs in the state, rather than tax increases.

Democratic Advisory Question Three asked whether medical marijuana should be legalized for the treatment of "severe, chronic illnesses."

Republican Question 1 asked whether the "privileges and immunities" of South Carolina citizens under the state constitution should be extended to unborn fetuses.

Republican Question 2 asked whether the state income tax should be reduced by 1.4% a year until it no longer exists.

Constitutional amendments

In the general election, voters voted on two amendments.

Amendment One amended the state's constitution to allow non-profit organizations to hold raffles for fundraising purposes.  It passed.

Amendment Two amended the state's constitution to make the adjutant general appointed by the governor, rather than popularly elected.  It passed.

References

 
South Carolina